Fluorobenzaldehyde is a group of three  constitutional isomers of fluorinated benzaldehyde.

Properties 
The isomers differ in the location of the fluorine, but they have the same chemical formulas.

Preparation 
The 4-fluorobenzaldehyde isomer can be produced by a halogen-exchange reaction with 4-chlorobenzaldehyde.

Uses 
Fluorobenzaldehyde can be used as a synthetic intermediate because the fluorine can be replaced via oxidation reaction. Due to the aldehyde group, the fluorobenzaldehydes can be used to make a variety of schiff base compounds through a condensation reaction. Schiff bases containing halogenated aromatic rings exhibit antimicrobial properties.

References

Benzaldehydes
Fluoroarenes